"Happy Together" is a song written by Garry Bonner and Alan Gordon and recorded by American rock band the Turtles. It was released as a single, b/w "Like the Seasons", in January 1967, and peaked at number one on the US Billboard Hot 100, becoming the band's first and only chart-topper there. The song also reached the top 20 in diverse countries, including number 2 in Canada and number 12 in the UK. It was later included on their third studio album, Happy Together (1967). 

Bonner and Gordon composed the song while still members of The Magicians. The lyrics, despite the joyous sound of the music, express an unrequited, imagined love. They recorded a demo consisting of a simple arrangement of acoustic guitar and hand claps. The demo was offered to and rejected by a dozen artists, due to its primitive sound. The Turtles, who had come from commercial and personal problems, found the demo and, thinking the song a potential hit, initially rehearsed it in live performances. They recorded their version in the Sunset Sound studio, with the newly-arrived bassist Chip Douglas arranging the horns and backing vocals.

After the song's successful release, the band were called to perform on several TV shows like The Ed Sullivan Show and The Smothers Brothers Show on 1967. Music critics have continued to praise the Turtles version for its pop qualities. It was covered by several acts, with the most successful cover being from the soft rock duo Captain & Tennille, and featured on numerous movies and TV shows. Thus, the song is inducted in the list of the most-performed songs in the United States of the 20th century by BMI in 1999, and the Grammy Hall of Fame in 2007. Howard Kaylan and Mark Volman, singers of the Turtles, were involved on various legal battles due their attempts to copyright "Happy Together" against unauthorized broadcasts, notably with Sirius XM Radio.

Background
Alan Gordon had served as the drummer and one of the primary songwriters of the Magicians since its conception from Tex & the Chex. He wrote and co-wrote a number of songs for the band, most famously "An Invitation to Cry" (with Jimmy Woods). Gordon already had many of the lyrics in mind for "Happy Together" but the chorus of the song came to him at the Park Street Diner in Ayer, Massachusetts, after visiting his father. The melody was based on the constant tuning of guitarist Allan "Jake" Jacobs during the band's concerts. After a failed attempt to convince Jacobs to write the song with him, Gordon finished it with vocalist Garry Bonner.

In 1965, Bonner and Gordon started to work with publishers Charles Koppelman and Don Rubin from the Koppelman/Rubin Associates, writing songs for artists selected by them. The songwriters cut a demo of "Happy Together" and offered it to several artists including the Happenings, the Vogues and the Tokens, but it was rejected by all of them. 

Around the same time, California band the Turtles had been struggling with financial and personal problems. After scoring three Top 40 hits in 1965 and 1966, including Bob Dylan's "It Ain't Me Babe" and "You Baby", their next five singles had not charted well. Chip Douglas and John Barbata had stepped in as replacements for the original members. As an act focused on singles, member Mark Volman explained that their lack of success almost led the Turtles to breaking up. 

As the Turtles didn't write most of the A-sides of their singles, lead vocalist Howard Kaylan mentions in his autobiography and also in the Turtles' documentary that they found "Happy Together" after spending some time to listen to submitted demos by publishing companies. Volman remembers it in a slightly different way, saying that Bonner and Gordon themselves between the sets of a Manhattan gig asked the band if they needed material and then subsequently sent some demos that included "Happy Together". Because of its circulation with many other artists, the demo acetate was worn out and, according to Fred Bronson, "practically unlistenable" with Kaylan describing the acetate as "scratchy and sticky".

While interviewed by Grammy Awards, Howard Kaylan said that when he heard it the first time he considered the recording to be "terrible" and later understood that the rejects by other artists were due to the performance. Kaylan recalled that the demo consisted of "one guy (Gary Bonner) strumming an acoustic guitar while the other (Alan Gordon) sings in a bizarre falsetto to get a semblance of rhythm going. Their voices were abysmal". Volman agreed with Kaylan, calling the demo "amateurish, lacking any kind of professional performance". 

Conversely, Brill Building session guitarist Ralph Casale, in an interview with Songfacts (and probably unaware of Kaylan and Volman's statements) affirmed that he had played on the demo and that other session musicians were involved. The performance was in a "Lovin' Spoonful feel" and praised it as much like a "finished product".

Stereogum critic Tom Breihan comments that the Turtles were "hungry" for a hit and with Bonner and Gordon's song "it all fit". Volman observed:

Recording 

Wanting to record the song, the Turtles had the writers travel from New York to California where Garry Bonner and Alan Gordon performed for them live at the Beverly Hills Hotel. According to Kaylan, "they sounded even worse than the demo, but it didn't matter. We wanted this song, and they and their publishers [Koppelman-Rubin] certainly wanted us to have it. The group rehearsed "Happy Together" in live performances for eight months, although music author Wayne Wadhams states the rehearsals lasted only two weeks. With the audience's response becoming very positive, the band members decided to record it in January 1967.

Koppelman/Rubin, as the publishers of Bonner and Gordon songs, chose how "Happy Together" was going to be recorded, substituting the original producer Bones Howe with Joe Wissert and the Turtles' familiar United Western studios with Sunset Sound, that had been the studio for emerging artists like the Doors. "Happy Together"'s session was engineered by Sunset Sound regular Bruce Botnick.

Like all their records before, the band – Kaylan, Volman, guitarists Al Nichol and Jim Tucker, bassist Chip Douglas and drummer John Barbata – played on the recording of "Happy Together" (their independent label, White Whale, could not afford LA session musicians to augment or replace them like other artists on bigger labels), while being accompanied by an orchestra of horns and woodwinds.

According to engineer Botnick, the Turtles benefited from an eight-track recorder, with that the first three tracks were for the basic track, the other three were for the vocals and the seventh was for the orchestra overdubs. Barbata recalled that they recorded the basic track (drums, bass and guitars) in the same time, and then overdubbed the vocals and the orchestra. Volman said that the band usually didn't experiment in the studio, and, for him, the process of recording was unremarkable. Botnick agreed with him, stating that the session was short, and he would be surprised if it lasted more than three hours, "maybe another three hours to do vocals, and it was basically done". Kaylan wrote that he recorded his lead vocals in one take. The basic track was cut in 15 takes according to Fred Bronson's book The Billboard Book of Number One Hits, but Barbata presumed that they had achieved a satisfying sound in only two takes.

Although some members of the band contributed to the record's arrangements, probably the most cited is from Chip Douglas. With only nine months in the group, Douglas proved to be important for the record by arranging the horns and the backing vocals. Both Kaylan and Volman praised his arrangements, with the former stating that "Chip knew what he wanted to hear and he actually heard in his head the blend of horns and voices. He wanted to have the flutes echo the high voices and the horns be the middle voices". John Barbata credited himself for creating "those drum parts that helped make it [the record] magical".

After the orchestra was overdubbed, Kaylan stated that he remembered that he took mono acetate to his home and started to hear it numerous times. "I just couldn’t believe how well the orchestra sat with the track, and how well the vocals blended, and just the overall mysterious sound we got. We knew it was gonna be a No.1 record". He noted that the song's production had sparse instrumentation in some portions while other segments were described as being "so 'Wall of Sound'", referring to the production methods of record producer Phil Spector consisting of heavily layered instrumentation optimized for mono, indicating his influence on Wissert.

Composition 
"Happy Together" was originally published in the key of E minor, but Wadhams and music teacher Emily Langerholc observed that the Turtles' recording is in F minor during the verses and F major on the chorus. The song is in common time with a tempo of 120 beats per minute. It starts with an electric guitar, followed by drums and electric bass, then Kaylan starts to sing the first two verses, reinforced by another guitar and reverberated vocal harmonies in the second verse, before the chorus begins (consisting of double-tracked lead vocals are backed by four part "ah" singing and trumpets). The switch of minor key verses to the major key chorus is called by Langerholc as "one of the most effective minor to major switcharoos of all time", citing that the change is preceded by a C chord (V) at the end of the verse and is in Common Tone Modulation. This structure accompanies Kaylan in the third verse, the second chorus, the first repeat of the third verse (harmonizing with Volman), the "baa, baa" chorus and the outro: the second repeat of the third with the coda, that consists of another "baa, baa" section with the joining of the orchestra and the band, before the reverb fades the song. Langerholc stated that the outro (F minor key verse with the F major key coda) is possibly a Picardy Third.

Many listeners (like Langerholc) thought that the lyrics of "Happy Together" were about a couple in love with each other due to its cheery chorus and the title, but, according to historian James E. Perone, a closer reading in the lyrics ("imagine me and you", "if i should call you") reveals that the love expressed by the narrator is not reciprocated by the other person, with Perone stating that the relationship "is only in dreams, wishes, desires and the mind of the singer". O'Rourke felt that the song "stretches the contrast between the loneliness of being apart and the thrill of being together to bipolar extremes". Joe Viglione compared "Happy Together"'s lyrics to Tommy James's hit "Mirage", but while "Mirage" was about an ex-girlfriend, "the Turtles never even get to first base in their laments". O'Rourke observed that is the listener's option to determine if in the final line "We're happy together", the narrator conquered his beloved, "or if he’s just retreated into his fantasy world for good".

Release and commercial performance

"Happy Together" was released as a single in January 1967, backed with the Warren Zevon-penned "Like the Seasons". To promote the single, the band members performed in a couple of shows, including The Smothers Brothers Comedy Hour in February. The Turtles would be called to perform on The Ed Sullivan Show in May 14, 1967, and again, as a quintet, on November 12 (Tucker had left for personal reasons).  During this time, Douglas had left the Turtles to produce the Monkees. His replacement was Jim Pons, formerly from the Leaves. With Pons, they participated in a film shot in March that consisted of "the group running, jumping, rolling and mugging in a park in Los Angeles". Guitarist Tucker said in an interview that the park location was possibly Griffith Park. 

According to Volman, the song slowly climbed through the charts, saying that "it took maybe three or four weeks before it even got into the Top 20". He credits the radio airplay for helping the song to top the charts, on March 25, overtaking The Beatles' "Penny Lane". It stayed at #1 for three weeks before being knocked out of the #1 position by Frank and Nancy Sinatra's duet "Somethin' Stupid". In total, the record stayed on the Billboard Hot 100 charts for 15 weeks. "Happy Together" was the breakthrough hit for the Turtles in Britain, where it peaked at number 12. The single, mainly distributed by London Recordings on other countries, became a Top 10 hit in Australia, Canada, Malaysia, Mexico, New Zealand, Singapore, and Spain. 

An album of the same name was released in April 1967.  The song was performed on other shows as well, both as a sextet or a quintet. "Happy Together" sold one million copies, and was certified Gold by the RIAA on May 4.

Reception and accolades 
The single received primarily good reviews in the American press at the time. Billboard magazine described "Happy Together" as a "groovy folk-oriented item" that could repeat the chart success of the Turtles' earlier hit single "It Ain't Me, Babe (also predicting that the song would reach the Top 20) and praised Joe Wissert's production. It is similarly described in Cashbox magazine, where they write that it is a "happy go-lucky melody-rocker" regarding a boy who has fallen in love. They end the review by noting that it might become a hit for the group. In Record World, the song was ranked a "sleeper of the week", stating that the group are "happy together", which they had to be in order to get the song "into the grooves". In the UK, the single also received praise. In Disc & Music Echo, critic Penny Valentine writes that the group has a "divine sound going" on the song. She positively notes the guitars, which she considers "warm", and closes the review by stating that the lead singer "threads" the lyrics together. Peter Jones from Record Mirror believes that "Happy Together" starts off tamely which escalates into a "most commercial sort of sound." He also adds that the chorus appealed to him the most. All in all, he gave the single four stars.

Since then, the song has received positive reviews. the Denise Sullivan of AllMusic stated that the Turtles had combined "all their pop, folk, psychedelia, and Zombies-style harmony expertise" into "Happy Together", while considering it a "pop perfection" and "a most sublime slice of pop heaven". In his book, Sixties Rock, a Listener's Guide, Robert Santelli called the song "arguably one of the two or three greatest pop constructions with its intricate arrangement and great harmonies". Wadhams called it a "brilliant pop production, deftly crafted by Joe Wissert", while observing that "good pop can be produced by formula, but great pop — like The Turtles' best — combines real music art with a pure, ear-charming entertainment". A reviewer from The Daily Guru claimed that "the way in which The Turtles take a base of folk music, yet give it a more rock-style edge and mood is the most obvious difference, and the manner with which the chorus sections seem to soar away from the rest of the song is where "Happy Together" truly becomes an unforgettable moment in music history".

Some reviewers and authors labeled it "bubblegum pop", but Sullivan and The Daily Guru reviewer observed that, despite its bubblegum sensibilities, the song "rises above it" and its "[later] continued legendary status makes it far more than that".

In a less positive reception, Breihan, reviewing all the songs that topped the US charts for Stereogum, praised it for its instrumentation but felt that the Turtles were only using the Beatles and the Beach Boys innovations to "put them in service of the sort of silly no-stakes love songs that those bands might’ve recorded a few years earlier in their career. He gave it a 8/10.

Due to its subsequent popularity, in 1999, BMI named "Happy Together", with approximately five million performances on American radio, the 44th most-performed song in the United States of the 20th century, placing it in the same league as "Yesterday" by the Beatles and "Mrs. Robinson" by Simon and Garfunkel. And, in 2007, it was inducted into the Grammy Hall of Fame.

Copyright lawsuits 
Flo & Eddie, legal successors to the Turtles, filed a lawsuit in the New York Court of Appeals against Sirius XM Radio to establish common law copyright on their original recording of "Happy Together". As the song was recorded in 1967, five years before federal sound copyright was established, the group sought to establish that such recordings were covered under common law copyright, a nebulous form of copyright held at the state level, in the hopes of earning royalties from Sirius XM; as they did not write the song, they could only receive performance royalties. The Court of Appeals had previously ruled that such a common law copyright may exist for the sale of recordings in New York in the 2005 ruling Capitol Records, Inc. v. Naxos of America, Inc..

On December 20, 2016, the Court ruled that no such common law copyright exists in New York for public performances of a sound recording, and that Flo & Eddie could not claim royalties.

On March 20, 2016, Scottish rock band Biffy Clyro released their single "Wolves of Winter", which originally featured the lyric "we have the chance to be happy together" in the pre-chorus, sung in a similar manner to the Turtles' recording. However, the lyric was changed due to copyright infringement, becoming "we have the chance to survive the winter", as sung in the second pre-chorus.

Usage in the movie Adaptation 
Jim Bessman reported for Billboard that the "key usage in the acclaimed movie" Adaptation is "as a means of juxtaposing a soundtrack song against the story's mood, à la 'As Time Goes By' in Casablanca". Bessman goes on to say that "the song's inclusion in Adaptation has also spurred the solo side of Kaylan's career."

Personnel 
According to Tom Pinnock and Wayne Wadhams, except where noted, 

The Turtles
 Howard Kaylan – lead and backing vocals
 Mark Volman – backing vocals
 Al Nichol – lead guitar, keyboards, backing vocals
 Jim Tucker – rhythm guitar, backing vocals
 Chip Douglas – bass guitar, backing vocals, horn and woodwind arrangements
 John Barbata – drums

Charts

Weekly charts

Year-end charts

All-time charts

Certifications

Notes

References

External links
 [ Allmusic.com 'Happy Together']
 The Turtles official website
 Singer Howard Kaylan's website 
 Bonner-Gordon songs website
 

1967 songs
1967 singles
Billboard Hot 100 number-one singles
Cashbox number-one singles
The Turtles songs
Hugo Montenegro songs
T. G. Sheppard songs
Petula Clark songs
Caterina Valente songs
Songs written by Alan Gordon (songwriter)
Song recordings with Wall of Sound arrangements